Kevin De Bont (born 18 February 1987) is a Belgian sprint canoer who competed in the late 2000s. At the 2008 Summer Olympics in Beijing, he was eliminated in the semifinals of the K-2 1000 m event.

References
Sports-Reference.com profile

1987 births
Belgian male canoeists
Canoeists at the 2008 Summer Olympics
Living people
Olympic canoeists of Belgium
Place of birth missing (living people)